A quark-nova  is the hypothetical violent explosion resulting from the conversion of a neutron star to a quark star. Analogous to a supernova heralding the birth of a neutron star, a quark nova signals the creation of a quark star. The term quark-novae was coined in 2002 by Dr. Rachid Ouyed (currently at the University of Calgary, Canada) and Drs. J. Dey and M. Dey (Calcutta University, India).

The nova process 
When a neutron star spins down, it may convert to a quark star through a process known as quark deconfinement. The resultant star would have quark matter in its interior. The process would release immense amounts of energy, perhaps explaining the most energetic explosions in the universe; calculations have estimated that as much as 1046 J could be released from the phase transition inside a neutron star. Quark-novae may be one cause of gamma ray bursts. According to Jaikumar et al., they may also be involved in producing heavy elements such as platinum through r-process nucleosynthesis.

Candidates 
Rapidly spinning neutron stars with masses between 1.5 and 1.8 solar masses are theoretically the best candidates for conversion due to spin down of the star within a Hubble time. This amounts to a small fraction of the projected neutron star population. A conservative estimate based on this, indicates that up to two quark-novae may occur in the observable universe each day.

Theoretically, quark stars would be radio-quiet, so radio-quiet neutron stars may be quark stars.

Observations 
Direct evidence for quark-novae is scant; however, recent observations of supernovae SN 2006gy, SN 2005gj and SN 2005ap may point to their existence.

See also

References

External links
Quark-novae produce neutrino bursts, which can be detected by neutrino observatories
Quark Stars Could Produce Biggest Bang (SpaceDaily) June 7, 2006
Quark Nova Project animations (University of Calgary)

Quark stars
Supernovae
Hypothetical astronomical objects